Adam Hess (born April 4, 1981) is an American-German retired professional basketball player who last played for Phoenix Hagen in Germany's Basketball Bundesliga. He previously played for ratiopharm Ulm. After graduating from William & Mary in 2004, Hess began his career overseas with ČEZ Nymburk in the Czech Republic's National Basketball League. In his two seasons with the team, he was named an All-Star and his team won league championships. Hess has acquired German citizenship and is eligible to play for German national teams if he chooses.

References

External links
College statistics @ sports-reference.com
Eurobasket profile

1981 births
Living people
American expatriate basketball people in France
American expatriate basketball people in Germany
American expatriate basketball people in Spain
American expatriate basketball people in the Czech Republic
American men's basketball players
Artland Dragons players
Basketball players from Michigan
CB Tarragona players
Basketball Nymburk players
Chorale Roanne Basket players
Eastern Michigan Eagles men's basketball players
Sportspeople from Warren, Michigan
Phoenix Hagen players
Ratiopharm Ulm players
Small forwards
William & Mary Tribe men's basketball players